Ted or Teddy Wilson may refer to:

Ted Wilson (mayor) (born 1939), mayor of Salt Lake City
Ted Wilson (American football) (born 1964), former American football wide receiver
Ted Wilson (footballer) (1855–1???), footballer who played for Stoke
Ted N. C. Wilson, president of the General Conference of the Seventh-day Adventist Church
Teddy Wilson (1912–1986), jazz pianist
Teddy Wilson (television personality), TV personality and producer
Teddy Wilson (rugby union), Australian rugby union player

See also
Theodore Wilson (1943–1991), American character actor
Edward Wilson (disambiguation)